Madhav Nagar is a residential locality within Ujjain, Madhya Pradesh, India. Here also many developers and real estate prices have shot up and are comparable to any posh areas of Ujjain. One side of Ujjain Junction is called as Madhav Nagar railway station.

Places in Madhav Nagar include:

 Dussehra Maidan
 Madhav Nagar Police Station
 Nehru Park
 Madhav Nagar Hospital
 Kalidas Montessori School
 Ujjain Public School
 Sandipani Law College
 Girls Degree College
 Kiddoo School

See also 

 Ujjain

External links 

 Official Website

References 

Ujjain
Neighbourhoods in Ujjain